Sumbawanga Airport  is an airport in western Tanzania serving the town of Sumbawanga in Rukwa Region. The government has sought funds from the European Investment Bank for the upgrade of the airport.

Stella Manyanga, the Rukwa Regional Commissioner has instead urged the government to construct a new airport at Kisumba village as the present facility does not have enough land for future expansion. In April 2013, the Tanzania Airports Authority allocated funds for the evaluation of the area for the proposed future airport.

See also

List of airports in Tanzania
Transport in Tanzania

References

External links
Tanzania Airports Authority

Airports in Tanzania
Buildings and structures in the Rukwa Region